Røyken is a railway station on the Spikkestad Line and is located in Røyken, Norway. The station was opened as part of Drammenbanen in 1872 and was for many years the only railway station in Røyken. The station was located close the old Church in Røyken (from 1229). 

The station is served by commuter trains to Oslo Central Station and onward to Lillestrøm.

References

External links

Railway stations in Røyken
Railway stations on the Spikkestad Line
Railway stations opened in 1872
1872 establishments in Norway